Summer Lake is a large, shallow, alkali lake in Lake County, Oregon, United States located  south of the small, unincorporated community of Summer Lake, Oregon. The lake was named by explorer John C. Fremont on his expedition into Central Oregon in 1843.

Ancient Lake Chewaucan 
The arid lands around Summer Lake were once lush. During the Pleistocene Epoch, vast areas of this region of south central Oregon were covered by lakes and wetlands. As the last ice age was ending, rain and runoff from melting snow filled the lowlands throughout this region of the Great Basin, creating an immense, freshwater lake called Lake Chewaucan.

Lake Chewaucan covered the Summer Lake basin and drainage system much of the late Pleistocene.  The last high water period is thought to have occurred about 13,000 years ago.  There is archaeological evidence of human use of Lake Chewaucan during this time. The oldest known human remains in the Western Hemisphere come from the Paisley Caves, wave-cut caves currently 10 miles southwest from Summer Lake. Lake Chewaucan began to dry up at the close of the Pleistocene.  As it shrank, salts and alkali were concentrated in its remaining waters.  The exposed lake bottom sediments were blown by the prevailing westerly winds to form the sand dunes that still lie on the east side of Summer Lake.

The main source of fresh water is the small spring-fed Ana River, which is used for irrigation.

Fremont expedition 
Summer Lake was spotted and named by Captain John C. Frémont during his 1843 mapping expedition through central Oregon.  Fremont and his Army topographical team were mapping the Oregon Territory from The Dalles on Columbia River to Sutter's Fort in Sacramento, California. On 16 December 1843, the expedition struggled down a steep cliff from a snow-covered plateau to reach a large lake in the valley below.  Fremont named the snow-covered rim "Winter Ridge" and the temperate waters "Summer Lake."  Fremont described the discovery and naming of Summer Lake as follows:

Wildlife refuge 
The Summer Lake Basin supports more than 250 species of birds including bald eagles, Canada geese, white faced ibis, yellow-headed blackbirds, goshawks, hermit thrushes, red-tail hawks, great blue herons, and numerous species of ducks.  This makes Summer Lake a favorite bird watching and hunting area.

The Oregon Department of Fish and Wildlife maintains the Summer Lake Wildlife Area on the north side of the lake.  The refuge consists of a large wetland marsh fed by the Ana River with associated high desert uplands with an  tour route open to the public most of the year.  The refuge headquarters is located adjacent to Oregon Route 31 in the town of Summer Lake, directly across from the Summer Lake Lodge.

Dust storm
Chalky residue coated cars and windows in Hermiston, Spokane, and at least 13 other cities.

See also 
 Fremont-Winema National Forests
 List of lakes in Oregon

References

External links 

 Summer Lake Wildlife Refuge
 Lake County Oregon's Outback

Lakes of Oregon
Wetlands of Oregon
Landforms of Lake County, Oregon
Lakes of Lake County, Oregon
Endorheic lakes of Oregon